Goalball was contested at the 2011 Parapan American Games from November 13 to 19 at the San Rafael Gymnasium in Guadalajara, Mexico.

Medal summary

Medal table

Medal events

Schedule
The competition will be spread out across seven days, with the men and women competing on each day.

Men

Preliminary round

Elimination round

Semifinals

Bronze Medal Final

Gold Medal Final

Women

Preliminary round

Elimination round

Semifinals

Bronze Medal Final

Gold Medal Final

External links
2011 Parapan American Games – Goalball

Events at the 2011 Parapan American Games